Helvi Mustonen (born 1 July 1947 in Kemi), is a Finnish artist and a painter. Mustonen's works of art are mainly paintings, but she also creates sculptures in bronze. Helvi Mustonen's art has typically very strong and emotional themes and strong colours. The paintings are usually quite dark and symbolistic.

Mustonen was born in Kemi. She started painting and sculpting in Oulu during the early 1970s and continued in Hyvinkää where she moved in the early 1980s. Since then Mustonen has taken part in numerous group exhibitions and has had her own solo exhibitions in many art museums and galleries in Finland.

Helvi Mustonen was named the Artist of the Year by the Art Guild of Hyvinkää in 2000 and 2011.

References

External links
 Helvi Mustonen Homepage and Internet Gallery

1947 births
Living people
People from Kemi
20th-century Finnish women artists
21st-century Finnish women artists
Finnish women painters